Voi is a town in Kenya.

Voi may also refer to:
 Voi Constituency, Kenya
 Voi shrew (Crocidura voi), a species of mammal in the family Soricidae, found in Africa
 The ICAO airline identifier for Volaris
 Voi Technology AB, a Swedish company manufacturing electric scooters

VOI, as an acronym, may refer to:
 Value of information
 Variant of interest, a category used during the assessment of a new variant of a virus
 Voice of India, an Indian publishing company
 Voice of Indonesia, an international radio service of Radio Republik Indonesia
 Volume of Interest

See also
 "Voi Voi", the Norwegian entry in the Eurovision Song Contest 1960